Mélanie Fazi (born 29 November 1976) is a French novelist and translator specialising in fantasy fiction.  As well as writing award-winning fiction of her own she has translated works by Lois McMaster Bujold, Elizabeth Moon, Poppy Z. Brite and Graham Joyce into French for Éditions Bragelonne, a French publisher.

Notable Awards
2002: Prix Merlin ( "Merlin Prize") for Matilda (original novel)
2004: Prix Merlin for Trois Pépins du fruit des morts ( "Three Seeds of the Fruit of the Dead") (original novel)
2005: Prix Masterton ( "Masterton Prize") for Arlis des forains ( "Arlis fairground") (original novel)
2005: Grand Prix de l'Imaginaire ( "Grand Prize of the Imagination") for Serpentine (original novel)
2007: Grand Prix de l'Imaginaire for Lignes de vie ( "Lifelines") (translation)
2009: Prix Masterton for Notre-Dame-aux-Ecailles ( "Our Lady of Scales") (original novel)
2010: Prix Masterton for Miroir de porcelaine ( "Porcelain Mirror") (original novel)

References

This material was abridged and translated from the equivalent article on the French Wikipedia on 28 October 2010.

Living people
1976 births
French fantasy writers
People from Dunkirk
French translators
English–French translators